Baker Township is one of fourteen townships in Morgan County, Indiana, United States. As of the 2010 census, its population was 717 and it contained 274 housing units.  The township contains Morgan–Monroe State Forest.

Geography

Unincorporated towns
 Turkey Track at 
(This list is based on USGS data and may include former settlements.)

Cemeteries
The township contains Sodom Cemetery.

Major highways
  Indiana State Road 37

School districts
 Metropolitan School District of Martinsville Schools

Political districts
 Indiana's 4th congressional district
 State House District 47
 State Senate District 37

References
 
 United States Census Bureau 2008 TIGER/Line Shapefiles
 IndianaMap

External links
 Indiana Township Association
 United Township Association of Indiana
 City-Data.com page for Baker Township

Townships in Morgan County, Indiana
Townships in Indiana